SS Radaas was a 2524-ton cargo steamship. She was built by and launched in 1890 as Marstonmoor for Moor Lines. She was sold to a Greek company in 1902 and renamed Athos Romanos, before being sold to Danish interests during the First World War and renamed Radaas. She was sunk by the German submarine UB-40 under the command of Oberleutnant Hans Howaldt on 21 September 1917.   She was 18 miles west of Portland Bill en route from Tyne to Bordeaux when the torpedo struck her in the port side.  

References 

Wreck diving sites in England
Steamships of Denmark
World War I merchant ships of Denmark
Merchant ships of Greece
Merchant ships of the United Kingdom
World War I shipwrecks in the English Channel
Maritime incidents in 1917
Ships sunk by German submarines in World War I
1890 ships
Ships built on the River Tyne
1917 in England